Eugenio Scarpellini (8 January 1954 – 15 July 2020) was an Italian-born Bolivian Roman Catholic bishop.

Biography
Scarpellini was born in Italy and was ordained to the priesthood in 1974. He served as titular bishop of Bida and as auxiliary bishop of the Roman Catholic Diocese of El Alto, Bolivia from 2010 to 2013 and as bishop of the El Alto Diocese from 2013 until his death in 2020, when he died after contracting COVID-19 during the COVID-19 pandemic in Bolivia.

Notes

1954 births
2020 deaths
21st-century Roman Catholic bishops in Bolivia
Italian Roman Catholic bishops in South America
Italian expatriates in Bolivia
Deaths from the COVID-19 pandemic in Bolivia
Roman Catholic bishops of El Alto